SS Carter Braxton was a Liberty ship built in the United States during World War II. She was named after Carter Braxton, a Founding Father and signer of the United States Declaration of Independence, as well as a merchant, planter, and Virginia politician. A grandson of Robert "King" Carter, one of the wealthiest and most powerful landowners and slaveholders in the Old Dominion, Carter Braxton was active in Virginia's legislature for more than 25 years.

Construction
Carter Braxton was laid down on 3 September 1941, under a Maritime Commission (MARCOM) contract, MCE hull 22, by the Bethlehem-Fairfield Shipyard, Baltimore, Maryland; and was launched on 24 January 1942.

History
She was allocated to the Union Sulphur & Oil Co., Inc., on 18 March 1942. She was sold for commercial use on 19 June 1947, to the Union Sulphur & Oil Co., Inc., and renamed Herman Frasch, after Herman Frasch.

References

Bibliography

 
 
 
 

 

Liberty ships
Ships built in Baltimore
1942 ships
Ships named for Founding Fathers of the United States